Joel Allen Battle (September 19, 1811 – August 23, 1872) was an American politician and soldier. He was appointed a Tennessee militia general in 1835 during the Second Seminole War. He was a colonel in the Confederate States Army during the American Civil War.

Early life
Joel Battle was born in Davidson County, Tennessee, on September 19, 1811. He became an orphan at an early age, but despite this became a very rich man under the slavery system economics of Tennessee. By 19 years old, he married Sarah Searcy who gave birth to his first son William. Sarah died two years after giving birth. Battle, now a widower, raised a company for the Second Seminole War in Cane Ridge. By 1835, Battle was promoted to brigadier general of the Tennessee Militia. He eventually remarried to Adeline Sanders Mosley, and had 6 more children. He was also elected to the Tennessee General Assembly becoming a popular Whig.

Civil war
In April 1861, when the American Civil War began, Battle raised an infantry company in Nolensville, Tennessee, which he named the Zollicoffer Guards, paying respect to Felix Zollicoffer with whom he had fought with in Florida against the Seminole. The company became part of the 20th Tennessee Infantry and Battle was appointed as its colonel. The regiment joined a brigade commanded by Battle's good friend Zollicoffer. During the Battle of Mill Springs Zollicoffer was killed and Battle's son Lieutenant Joel Battle Jr., who was serving as the regimental adjutant, was wounded. In the Battle of Shiloh, Colonel Battle lost two of his sons, Joel Jr. and William. The Colonel was wounded and captured while looking for his sons – William's body was never found and Joel Jr. was discovered by John Calvin Lewis, a Union soldier who was recruited into Beta Theta Pi by Joel Jr. at Miami University. Out of respect for his brother, Lewis buried Joel Jr. in a personal grave. After his capture the demoralized Battle was brought to Johnson's Island, effectively ending his career in the military.

After being exchanged, Battle was appointed state treasurer of Tennessee, which he occupied until the end of the Civil War. When his son Frank Battle was captured during the war, he was used as leverage by the Union side to force the return of Captain Shad Harris who was under threat of execution as a spy. Joel Allen Battle relented and the prisoner transfer, which was endorsed by President Lincoln, took place. Battle also had to deal with the arrest and imprisoning of his daughter Fannie along with her friend Harriet Booker in Camp Chase on suspicion of her being a Confederate spy.

Later life
After the war, Battle was appointed superintendent of the Tennessee State Prison. He retained the position until his death, caused by severe dysentery, on August 23, 1872.

Notes

See also

1811 births
1872 deaths
Confederate States Army officers
People of Tennessee in the American Civil War
People from Davidson County, Tennessee
American people of the Seminole Wars
American militia generals
American slave owners